5-Bromo-DMT (5-bromo-N,N-dimethyltryptamine) is a psychedelic brominated indole alkaloid found in the sponges Smenospongia aurea and Smenospongia echina, as well as in Verongula rigida (0.00142% dry weight) alongside 5,6-Dibromo-DMT (0.35% dry weight) and seven other alkaloids. It is the 5-bromo derivative of DMT, a psychedelic found in many plants and animals.

5-Bromo-DMT has a pEC50 value of 5.51 for the 5-HT2A receptor.

Animal studies on 5-Bromo-DMT showed that it produces effects suggestive of sedative and antidepressant activity and caused significant reduction of locomotor activity in the rodent FST model.

5-Bromo-DMT was reported to be psychoactive at 20–50 mg via vaporization with mild psychedelic-like activity.

Legality
5-Bromo-DMT is specifically listed as a controlled drug in Singapore.

Related compounds 
 5-Chloro-αMT
 5-Fluoro-AMT
 5-Fluoro-DMT
 Convolutindole A
 Desformylflustrabromine
 Plakohypaphorine

References 

Biological sources of psychoactive drugs
Bromoarenes
Halogen-containing alkaloids
Psychedelic tryptamines
Serotonin receptor agonists
Tryptamine alkaloids